Sufiabad-e Sofla (also Romanized as Şūfīābād-e Soflá; also known as Şūfīābād) is a village in Shenetal Rural District, Kuhsar District, Salmas County, West Azerbaijan Province, Iran. According to the 2006 census, its population was 148, in 26 families.

References 

Populated places in Salmas County